Defending champion Ken Skupski and his partner, Jonny O'Mara, defeated Julian Cash and Henry Patten in the final, 3–6, 6–2, [16–14], to win the men's doubles tennis title at the 2022 Nottingham Open. The third seeds saved three championship points en route to the title.

Skupski had won the title in 2021 with Matt Reid, but Reid did not return to compete.

Seeds

Draw

References

External links
 Main draw

Nottingham Open - Men's doubles
2022 men's doubles